The mayor of Stamford, Connecticut, United States, is the city's chief executive.

History of the mayoralty

Before 1945, the city charter of the City of Stamford divided the city into two separate political jurisdictions: a central city with a "strong mayor" form of government and a town which employed the traditional town meeting form of government. From the 1930s, reformers began seeking to change this system on the grounds that it accorded too much power to the mayor and that the separation of the town and city for some purposes but not others "was an outmoded and inefficient way to govern a modern city."

In 1946, the Charter Consolidation Inquiry Commission, created by the Connecticut General Assembly, issued recommendations for Stamford government to unify under a single jurisdiction led by a strong mayor, and with a city council (called the Board of Representatives) of forty members, with two elected from twenty districts. These recommendations were approved by Stamford voters and the new system took effect on April 15, 1949.

Stamford retains its strong-mayor form of government today. The mayor appoints the departments heads, acts as chief executive officer of the city, and is responsible for presenting the budget to the board of finance, city council, and planning board. The city council approves the budget and passes ordinances and resolutions.  Both the mayor and the city council serve four-year terms, and there are no term limits.

List of mayors of Stamford
The following table lists the mayors of Stamford, as well as their dates in office, their dates of birth, and (if deceased) their dates of death.

Notes

External links
Consolidation - Fifty Years in the Making from the Stamford Board of Representatives

 
Stamford